Norma Massey (1924-2014) was an international lawn bowls competitor for Australia.

Bowls career

World Championships
Massey won the singles bronze medal and triples silver medal with Connie Hicks and Mary Ormsby, at the 1969 World Outdoor Bowls Championship in Sydney and also won a silver medal in the team event (Taylor Trophy). 

Eight years later she represented Australia in the singles and triples events finishing just outside the medals but was part of the team that claimed the gold medal in the team event (Taylor Trophy).

Sixteen years after her first World Championships she won the triples gold medal with Dorothy Roche and Mavis Meadowcroft, the fours silver medal with Meadowcroft, Roche and Fay Craig and the team event gold medal at the 1985 World Outdoor Bowls Championship in Melbourne.

Asia Pacific Championships
She won two medals at the Asia Pacific Bowls Championships including a gold medal in the 1985 triples at Tweed Heads, New South Wales.

National
Norma joined Yarraville Seddon Bowling Club in 1953 and represented Australia in 104 times.

Awards
Massey was awarded the Order of Australia for services to bowls in 2006. In 2011 she was inducted into Bowls Australia’s Hall of Fame. She died in October 2014.

References

1924 births
2014 deaths
Australian female bowls players
Bowls World Champions